Uppala is a town in Kasaragod district, Kerala. This is a list of Education Centres in Uppala

Education in Kasaragod district